Comic Court (1945–1973) was a most versatile post-war Australian  bred Thoroughbred racehorse who set race records at distances of 6 furlongs (1,200 metres) and 2 miles (3,200 metres). He won the 1950 Melbourne Cup carrying  and set an Australasian record of 3 minutes 19½ seconds.

Breeding
He was bred by the Bowyer brothers at their Beau Neire Stud, Normanville, South Australia. Comic Court was by Powerscourt (won Ascot Vale Stakes and sire of 12 stakes-winners for 51 stakes-wins), his dam, Witty Maid was by Anton King.

Powerscourt and Witty Maid were both sold by Jim M. Cummings for total of £150 during World War II, when racing was cancelled in Adelaide. Witty Maid was a handy race-mare and was an outstanding broodmare that produced five siblings to Comic Court. Her stakes-winners were:

Comedy Prince (1944, top sprinter, won 20 races including, Cantala Stakes, STC Railway Quality Handicap, Adelaide RC Adelaide Guineas, South Australia JC SA Stakes, SAJC Sires' Produce Stakes, AJC The Shorts, William Reid Stakes);
Gay Comedy (1948, won 10 races including SAJC Oaks, SAJC St. Leger Stakes, SAJC Auraria Stakes), and
St. Comedy (1946, won 22 races including ARC Adelaide Guineas, SAJC Goodwood Handicap, Moonee Valley Stakes, Ascot Vale (2yo) Stakes, VATC Debutant Stakes, PARC John Lewis Stakes, Adelaide RC Fulham Park Plate)

1951 racebook

Racing record
He was trained by Jim M. Cummings and his son, Bart Cummings, was Comic Court’s strapper.

Two-year-old: 1947-1948
Comic Court had eight starts for five wins including the Adelaide RC Fulham Park Plate, PARC Sires’ Produce Stakes and VRC Ascot Vale (2yo) Stakes plus three second places. His first start was in the Fulham Park Plate after which Comic Court was sold for 2,300 guineas to R. A., J.D. and A.J. Lee before winning four more starts as a 2yo.

Three-year-old: 1948-1949
Comic Court had 16 starts for 5 wins including the VRC Derby, Memsie Stakes, VRC St Leger Stakes plus 2 second places.

Four-year-old: 1949-1950
Comic Court had 14 starts for 8 wins including the Memsie Stakes, VRC Craiglee Stakes, VRC Turnbull Stakes, LKS Mackinnon Stakes, VATC St George Stakes, VRC Ercildoune Stakes and MVRC Alister Clark Stakes. He also ran second in the W.S. Cox Plate, William Reid Stakes and CF Orr Stakes as well as running third in the Caulfield Cup.

Five-year-old: 1950-1951
Comic Court had 16 starts for 10 stakes wins including the VATC Caulfield Stakes, VATC Memsie Stakes, L.K.S Mackinnon Stakes, Melbourne Cup, VRC Turnbull Stakes, AJC Chipping Norton Stakes, MRC CF Orr Stakes, MVRC William Reid Stakes, VATC St George Stakes and VRC Ercildoune Stakes. Additionally he ran second in another three stakes races and was third twice including the Sydney Cup. He won the 1950 Melbourne Cup carrying  by three lengths, with the third placegetter a further length away and he set an Australasian record time of 3 minutes 19½ seconds.

Stud record
Comic Court was retired to stud in 1951 at  E.A. Underwood’s Warlaby Stud.
His progeny included:
Asian Court, won Werribee Cup
Comicquita, second in the 1962 Melbourne Cup.
Droll Prince, won VRC Cantala Stakes and Williamstown Cup
Gurney, won MRC International Stakes
Harcourt, won Tatt's SA Tattersall's Cup

Comic Court was inducted into the Australian Racing Hall of Fame in 2009.

References

External links
 Comic Court's pedigree and partial racing stats

1945 racehorse births
1973 racehorse deaths
Australian Racing Hall of Fame horses
Melbourne Cup winners
Victoria Derby winners
Racehorses bred in Australia
Racehorses trained in Australia
Thoroughbred family 1-b